The 2019 WNBA season was the 22nd for the Washington Mystics of the Women's National Basketball Association. The season ended with the Mystics winning their first WNBA Championship.

The Mystics began playing at the St. Elizabeths East Entertainment and Sports Arena in  the 2019 season. The arena holds a maximum of 4,200 spectators per game.

They began the season on May 25, 2019 versus the Connecticut Sun. On August 31, with a victory over the Dallas Wings, the Mystics set a franchise record for wins at 23. The previous record was 22, held jointly by the 2010 and 2018 teams. They entered the playoffs as the top-seeded team, and defeated the Las Vegas Aces in the semifinals and the Connecticut Sun in the WNBA Finals.

Transactions

WNBA Draft

Trades/Roster Changes

Roster

Game log

Preseason

|- style="background:#fcc"
| 1
| May 10
| @ Minnesota Lynx
| L 79–86
| Meesseman (19)
| Meesseman (6)
| 3 tied (3)
| Target Center3,201
| 0–1
|- style="background:#bbffbb;"
| 2
| May 17
| @ Atlanta Dream
| W 75–64
| Walker-Kimbrough (18)
| Sanders (5)
| 3 tied (3)
| Albany Civic CenterN/A
| 1–1

Regular season 

|- style="background:#fcc"
| 1
| May 25
| @ Connecticut Sun
| L 69–84
| Meesseman (14)
| Sanders (9)
| Cloud (8)
| Mohegan Sun Arena7,913
| 0–1

|- style="background:#bbffbb;"
| 2
| June 1
| Atlanta Dream
| W 96–75
| Atkins (21)
| Hines-Allen (8)
| Toliver (5)
| St. Elizabeth's East Arena4,200
| 1–1
|- style="background:#bbffbb;"
| 3
| June 5
| Chicago Sky
| W 103–85
| Toliver (19)
| Delle Donne (7)
| Toliver (6)
| St. Elizabeth's East Arena2,347
| 2–1
|- style="background:#bbffbb;"
| 4
| June 7
| @ New York Liberty
| W 94–85
| Cloud (26)
| Delle Donne (8)
| Cloud (8)
| Westchester County Center1,567
| 3–1
|- style="background:#bbffbb;"
| 5
| June 9
| Dallas Wings
| W 86–62
| Hawkins (21)
| Delle Donne (9)
| Toliver (6)
| Westchester County Center3,564
| 4–1
|- style="background:#fcc"
| 6
| June 11
| @ Connecticut Sun
| L 75–83
| Atkins (18)
| Sanders (8)
| Cloud (8)
| Mohegan Sun Arena5,224
| 4–2
|- style="background:#fcc"
| 7
| June 14
| Seattle Storm
| L 71–74
| Delle Donne (19)
| Tied (8)
| Cloud (5)
| St. Elizabeth's East Arena3,654
| 4–3
|- style="background:#bbffbb;"
| 8
| June 18
| @ Los Angeles Sparks
| W 81–52
| Atkins (22)
| Delle Donne (15)
| Toliver (9)
| Staples Center9,537
| 5–3
|- style="background:#bbffbb;"
| 9
| June 20
| @ Las Vegas Aces
| W 95–72
| Delle Donne (29)
| Delle Donne (11)
| Cloud (7)
| Mandalay Bay Events Center4,416
| 6–3
|- style="background:#bbffbb;"
| 10
| June 23
| @ Atlanta Dream
| W 89–73
| Delle Donne (21)
| Delle Donne (10)
| Cloud (6)
| State Farm Arena4,136
| 7–3
|- style="background:#bbffbb;"
| 11
| June 26
| @ Chicago Sky
| W 81–74
| Delle Donne (22)
| Delle Donne (7)
| Cloud (5)
| Wintrust Arena8,914
| 8–3
|- style="background:#bbffbb;"
| 12
| June 29
| Connecticut Sun
| W 102–59
| Delle Donne (19)
| Delle Donne (10)
| Cloud (6)
| St. Elizabeth's East Arena4,200
| 9–3

|- style="background:#bbffbb;"
| 13
| July 5
| @ Las Vegas Aces
| W 99–70
| Delle Donne (21)
| Sanders (7)
| Cloud (9)
| Mandalay Bay Events CenterN/A
| 10–3
|- style="background:#fcc"
| 14
| July 7
| @ Los Angeles Sparks
| L 81–98
| Powers (24)
| Tied (8)
| Toliver (9)
| Staples Center10,336
| 10–4
|- style="background:#fcc"
| 15
| July 10
| Phoenix Mercury
| L 68–91
| Hawkins (24)
| Hawkins (7)
| Toliver (6)
| Capital One Arena15,377
| 10–5
|- style="background:#fcc"
| 16
| July 13
| Las Vegas Aces
| L 81–85
| Cloud (18)
| Sanders (10)
| Toliver (7)
| St. Elizabeth's East Arena4,200
| 10–6
|- style="background:#bbffbb;"
| 17
| July 19
| @ Indiana Fever
| W 95–88 (OT)
| Delle Donne (28)
| Delle Donne (15)
| Cloud (7)
| Bankers Life Fieldhouse6,726
| 11–6
|- style="background:#bbffbb;"
| 18
| July 21
| Atlanta Dream
| W 93–65
| Delle Donne (28)
| Delle Donne (8)
| Toliver (7)
| St. Elizabeth's East Arena4,200
| 12–6
|- style="background:#bbffbb;"
| 19
| July 24
| Minnesota Lynx
| W 79–71
| Toliver (32)
| Meesseman (6)
| Toliver (6)
| Target Center17,934
| 13–6
|- style="background:#bbffbb;"
| 20
| July 30
| Phoenix Mercury
| W 99–93
| Delle Donne (33)
| Powers (8)
| Cloud (6)
| St. Elizabeth's East Arena3,819
| 14–6

|- style="background:#bbffbb;"
| 21
| August 2
| @ Seattle Storm
| W 99–79
| Delle Donne (29)
| Delle Donne (12)
| Tied (5)
| Angel of the Winds Arena7,488
| 15–6
|- style="background:#fcc"
| 22
| August 4
| @ Phoenix Mercury
| L 82–103
| Tied (18)
| Tied (7)
| Cloud (7)
| Talking Stick Resort Arena9,025
| 15–7
|- style="background:#bbffbb;"
| 23
| August 8
| Indiana Fever
| W 91–78
| Delle Donne (22)
| Delle Donne (8)
| Toliver (11)
| St. Elizabeth's East Arena3,013
| 16–7
|- style="background:#bbffbb;"
| 24
| August 11
| Minnesota Lynx
| W 101–78
| Meesseman (25)
| Delle Donne (10)
| Cloud (4)
| St. Elizabeth's East Arena4,200
| 17–7
|- style="background:#bbffbb;"
| 25
| August 14
| Seattle Storm
| W 88–59
| Powers (16)
| Sanders (8)
| 5 tied (3)
| St. Elizabeth's East Arena3,917
| 18–7
|- style="background:#bbffbb;"
| 26
| August 16
| @ Minnesota Lynx
| W 86–79
| Atkins (18)
| Delle Donne (8)
| Tied (8)
| Target Center8,803
| 19–7
|- style="background:#bbffbb;"
| 27
| August 18
| Indiana Fever
| W 107–68
| Delle Donne (25)
| Delle Donne (9)
| Cloud (8)
| St. Elizabeth's East Arena4,034
| 20–7
|- style="background:#fcc"
| 28
| August 23
| @ Chicago Sky
| L 78–85
| Delle Donne (16)
| Delle Donne (7)
| Powers (5)
| Wintrust Arena6,131
| 20–8
|- style="background:#bbffbb;"
| 29
| August 25
| New York Liberty
| W 101–72
| Delle Donne (22)
| Delle Donne (10)
| Tied (5)
| St. Elizabeth's East Arena4,200
| 21–8
|- style="background:#bbffbb;"
| 30
| August 27
| Los Angeles Sparks
| W 95–66
| Powers (20)
| Sanders (9)
| Cloud (6)
| St. Elizabeth's East Arena4,200
| 22–8
|- style="background:#bbffbb;"
| 31
| August 31
| @ Dallas Wings
| W 91–85
| Delle Donne (22)
| Sanders (11)
| Meesseman (7)
| College Park Center5,205
| 23–8

|- style="background:#bbffbb;"
| 32
| September 3
| @ New York Liberty
| W 93–77
| Delle Donne (30)
| Tied (10)
| Cloud (9)
| Westchester County Center1,558
| 24–8
|- style="background:#bbffbb;"
| 33
| September 6
| Dallas Wings
| W 86–73
| Meesseman (25)
| Meesseman (10)
| Tied (5)
| St. Elizabeth's East Arena3,963
| 25–8
|- style="background:#bbffbb;"
| 34
| September 8
| Chicago Sky
| W 100–86
| Delle Donne (25)
| Delle Donne (12)
| Cloud (6)
| St. Elizabeth's East Arena4,200
| 26–8

Playoffs

|- style="background:#bbffbb;"
| 1
| September 17
| Las Vegas Aces
| W 97–95
| Meesseman (27)
| Meesseman (10)
| Delle Donne (6)
| St. Elizabeth's East Arena3,968
| 1–0
|- style="background:#bbffbb;"
| 2
| September 19
| Las Vegas Aces
| W 103–91
| Meesseman (30)
| Delle Donne (10)
| Cloud (11)
| St. Elizabeth's East Arena4,200
| 2–0
|- style="background:#fcc"
| 3
| September 22
| @ Las Vegas Aces
| L 75–92
| Delle Donne (22)
| Meesseman (8)
| Cloud (6)
| Mandalay Bay Events Center6,175
| 2–1
|- style="background:#bbffbb;"
| 4
| September 24
| @ Las Vegas Aces
| W 94–90
| Delle Donne (25)
| 3 tied (6)
| Tied (9)
| Mandalay Bay Events Center5,465
| 3–1

|- style="background:#bbffbb;"
| 1
| September 29
| Connecticut Sun
| W 95–86
| Delle Donne (22)
| Delle Donne (10)
| Cloud (7)
| St. Elizabeth's East Arena4,200
| 1–0
|- style="background:#fcc"
| 2
| October 1
| Connecticut Sun
| L 87–99
| Meesseman (23)
| Meesseman (8)
| Toliver (7)
| St. Elizabeth's East Arena4,200
| 1–1
|- style="background:#bbffbb;"
| 3
| October 6
| @ Connecticut Sun
| W 94–81
| Meesseman (21)
| Powers (8)
| Toliver (10)
| Mohegan Sun Arena9,170
| 2–1
|- style="background:#fcc"
| 4
| October 8
| @ Connecticut Sun
| L 86–90
| Powers (15)
| Cloud (7)
| Cloud (9)
| Mohegan Sun Arena8,458
| 2–2
|- style="background:#bbffbb;"
| 5
| October 10
| Connecticut Sun
| W 89–78
| Meesseman (22)
| Delle Donne (9)
| Toliver (4)
| St. Elizabeth's East Arena4,200
| 3–2

Standings

Playoffs

Statistics

Regular season

Awards and honors

References

External links
The Official Site of the Washington Mystics

Washington Mystics seasons
Washington
Women's National Basketball Association championship seasons
Washington Mystics